The National Museum of Ship Models and Sea History is a private non-profit museum, located in Sadorus, Illinois. It features ship models from around the world and throughout history.

Recent exhibits include a 27-foot model of the  made entirely out of one million toothpicks. The collection includes ship models from the movies Tora! Tora! Tora!, Cleopatra, and Ben-Hur as well as from the television series Tugboat Annie Sails Again.

The museum is open on Saturdays (11 a.m. - 4:30 p.m.) Saturdays from April 1 to November 30; also by appointment, including through the winter holidays.

In the press 
The museum was featured in a 2005 Chicago Tribune cover story.

Further reading 
Reid, Tony. “Sadorus Man and the Sea.” Herald & Review (Decatur, IL), 10 May 2010. Accessed through EBSCOhost. Retrieved 21 June 2019.

External links 
 Official website of the National Museum of Ship Models and Sea History

References

Museums in Champaign County, Illinois
Maritime museums in Illinois